Niaux is a commune in the Ariège department in southwestern France.

Located on the right banks of the Vicdessos river, Niaux is the site of the Cave of Niaux, which is famous for its prehistoric cave paintings of bison and horses from the Magdalenian era.

Population
Inhabitants are called Niauxéens.

See also
Communes of the Ariège department

References

Communes of Ariège (department)
Ariège communes articles needing translation from French Wikipedia